Kager is a surname. Notable people with the surname include:

Bernd Kager (born 1987), Austrian footballer
Johann Matthias Kager (1566–1634), German painter
Reinhard Kager (born 1954), Austrian philosopher, journalist, and music promoter
René Kager (born 1957), Dutch linguist